Hallier is a surname. Notable people with the surname include:

Ernst Hallier (1831–1904), German botanist and mycologist
Jean-Edern Hallier (1936–1997), French writer, critic and editor
Johannes Gottfried Hallier (1868–1932), German botanist
Lori Hallier (born 1959), Canadian film, stage and television actress

See also 
Château du Hallier, is a castle in the commune of Nibelle in the Loiret département of France